Brezovec is a settlement in the Municipality of Lendava in the Prekmurje region of Slovenia. The main part of the settlement lies on the opposite bank of the Mura River close to Sveti Martin na Muri in Croatia.

References

External links 
Brezovec on Geopedia

Populated places in the Municipality of Lendava